N-acetyltransferase 80 (also known as NAT6 or FUS2) is a protein that in humans is encoded by the NAA80 gene. It acetylates the N-terminus of mature actin.

Function 

This gene encodes a member of the N-acetyltransferase family. N-acetyltransferases modify proteins by transferring acetyl groups from acetyl-CoA to the N-termini of protein substrates. The encoded protein is a cytoplasmic N-acetyltransferase with a substrate specificity for N-termini that are enriched for acidic residues. This gene is located in the tumor suppressor gene region on chromosome 3p21.3, and the encoded protein may play a role in cancer. Alternatively spliced transcript variants encoding multiple isoforms have been observed. This gene overlaps and is on the same strand as hyaluronoglucosaminidase 3, and some transcripts of each gene share a portion of the first exon. [provided by RefSeq, Jan 2011].

Naa80 acetylates the N-terminus of mature actin. This N-terminal acetylation affects the rates of actin filament depolymerization and elongation, and the overall morphology of the cell.

Structure 

Naa80 is a member of the GNAT family of acetyltransferases. It has an overall fold similar to the other N-terminal acetyltransferases, but has a more open, basic active site to accommodate the acidic N-terminus of actin. Naa80 can acetylate peptides with different N-terminal residues, but the presence of acidic residues in positions 2 and 3 is important for substrate specificity. Most Naa80 orthologs have an extended polyproline loop which may be important for actin binding through profilin.

Clinical Significance 
Naa80 is thought to be involved in the function of the inner ear, brain and muscle, as individuals of one single family with bi-allelic mutations in NAA80 show sensorineural hearing loss, developmental delay, muscle weakness and craniofacial dysmorphisms.

References

Further reading